This is a list of notable residents and former residents of the London borough of Chelsea.

Henry George Kendall Ship Captain of the RMS Empress of Ireland.

References

People from Chelsea, London
Lists of English people